FC Skala Stryi is a Ukrainian football professional team from Stryi in Lviv oblast. The club currently competes in the Ukrainian Second League. It plays at Medyk Stadium in Morshyn that used to belong to former FC Medyk Morshyn.

It is the fourth reincarnation of Ukrainian sports club that existed in Austria-Hungary (Kingdom of Galicia and Lodomeria) in 1911.

History
The initiative to create the club beside Mykola Kmit came also from the member of the Board of directors of IDS Group, Vsevolod Bilas, and the president of the Georgian FC Gagra, Beso Chikhradze.

In 2004-2009 the club was competing in the Ukrainian Youth Football League as a youth football club FC Morshyn. At same time another club FC Hazovyk-Skala Stryi represented the neighboring city of Stryi in the Ukrainian First League. In 2006 Hazovyk-Skala was reorganized as FC Lviv and moved to Lviv. In 2009 FC Morshyn entered the professional ranks with their first game played as a friendly against FC Lviv. During the 2009–10 winter break it renamed itself to FC Skala Morshyn, while playing in Stryi.

On 10 February 2011 the club was renamed again to FC Skala Stryi due to the fact that it was playing in Stryi.

League and cup history

{|class="wikitable"
|-bgcolor="#efefef"
! Season
! Div.
! Pos.
! Pl.
! W
! D
! L
! GS
! GA
! P
!Domestic Cup
!colspan=2|Other
!Notes
|-
|align=center|2009
|align=center|4th "1"
|align=center|4
|align=center|8
|align=center|1
|align=center|1
|align=center|6
|align=center|12
|align=center|23
|align=center|4
|align=center|
|align=center|
|align=center|
|align=center|As FC Morshyn
|-bgcolor=PowderBlue
|align=center|2009–10
|align=center|3rd "A"
|align=center|11
|align=center|20
|align=center|1
|align=center|3
|align=center|16
|align=center|11
|align=center|40
|align=center|6
|align=center|1/32 finals
|align=center|PFL LC
|align=center|Group Stage
|align=center|As Skala Morshyn
|-bgcolor=PowderBlue
|align=center|2010–11
|align=center|3rd "A"
|align=center|7
|align=center|22
|align=center|10
|align=center|5
|align=center|7
|align=center|26
|align=center|19
|align=center|35
|align=center|1/32 finals
|align=center|
|align=center|
|align=center|moved to Stryi
|-bgcolor=PowderBlue
|align=center|2011–12
|align=center|3rd "A"
|align=center|9
|align=center|26
|align=center|8
|align=center|4
|align=center|14
|align=center|26
|align=center|36
|align=center|28
|align=center|1/32 finals
|align=center|
|align=center|
|align=center|
|-bgcolor=PowderBlue
|align=center rowspan=2|2012–13
|align=center|3rd "A"
|align=center|5
|align=center|20 	
|align=center|9 	
|align=center|6 	
|align=center|5 	
|align=center|19 	
|align=center|15 	
|align=center|33
|align=center rowspan=2|1/64 finals
|align=center|
|align=center|
|align=center|
|-bgcolor=PowderBlue
|align=center|3rd "1"
|align=center|5
|align=center|30 		
|align=center|10 	
|align=center|7 	
|align=center|13 	
|align=center|25 	
|align=center|41
|align=center|37
|align=center|
|align=center|
|align=center|Stage 2
|-bgcolor=PowderBlue
|align=center|2013–14
|align=center|3rd
|align=center|18
|align=center|35
|align=center|8
|align=center|3
|align=center|24
|align=center|22
|align=center|57
|align=center|27
|align=center|1/32 finals
|align=center|
|align=center|
|align=center|
|-bgcolor=PowderBlue
|align=center|2014–15
|align=center|3rd
|align=center|5
|align=center|27 	
|align=center|11 	
|align=center|5 	
|align=center|11 	
|align=center|29 	
|align=center|34 		
|align=center|38
|align=center|1/32 finals
|align=center|
|align=center|
|align=center|
|-bgcolor=PowderBlue
|align=center|2015–16
|align=center|3rd
|align=center|5
|align=center|26 	
|align=center|13 	
|align=center|7 	
|align=center|6 	
|align=center|41 	
|align=center|23 	
|align=center|46
|align=center|1/32 finals
|align=center|
|align=center|
|align=center bgcolor=green|Promoted 
|-bgcolor=LightCyan
|align=center|2016–17
|align=center|2nd
|align=center|17
|align=center|34 	
|align=center|5 	
|align=center|5 	
|align=center|24 	
|align=center|25 	
|align=center|58 	
|align=center|20
|align=center|1/32 finals
|align=center|
|align=center|
|align=center bgcolor=red|Relegated
|-bgcolor=PowderBlue
|align=center|2017–18
|align=center|3rd
|align=center|4
|align=center|27  
|align=center|12  	
|align=center|4  	
|align=center|11  
|align=center|29  	 	
|align=center|29
|align=center|40
|align=center|1/64 finals
|align=center|
|align=center|
|align=center|
|}

Managers
 2009–2010: Oleksandr Tomakh
 2011–2013: Volodymyr Reva
 2013–2014: Volodymyr Knysh
 2014–2017: Vasyl Malyk
 2017–2018: Roman Hnativ

Players

Current squad

Out on loan

Former players

  Nazar Kmit - made over 100 league appearances

Former emblems

See also
FC Gagra
FC Medyk Morshyn
FC Avanhard Zhydachiv
FC Skala Stryi

Notes

External links
 FC Skala – Official Website

References

External links
 Mykhailo Oliinyk. Anatoliy Petryk: I hope that my son also will be professional footballer (Анатолій Петрик: «Сподіваюся, що мій син теж буде професійним футболістом»). Fortuna newspaper. 29 December 2011

 
Football clubs in Stryi
2004 establishments in Ukraine
Association football clubs established in 2004
Sports team relocations